Jaat Na Poocho Prem Ki is an Indian Hindi-language romantic drama television series that premiered from 18 June 2019 to 26 August 2019 on & TV and is digitally available on ZEE5. An adaptation of Sairat and Dhadak, it starred Kinshuk Vaidya and Pranali Rathod.

Plot
Badal and Suman are from two different caste backgrounds, while Badal is a dalit, Suman is a brahmin. They are in love and try to pursue their relationship despite the social dictates of caste-ism. 

They attempt to change the mindset of their respective families and eventually the society. After facing several tribulations, Suman and Badal are reunited and they get married .

Cast

Main
 Kinshuk Vaidya as Badal: Chatura's son; Suman's husband
 Pranali Rathod as Suman Pandey: Pujan's daughter; Badal's wife

Recurring
 Sai Ballal as Pujan Pandey: Suman's father
 Avinash Mukherjee as Arjun Mishra: Sharmila's son; Suman's prospective groom
 Amita Choksi as Chatura: Badal's mother
 Garima Agarwal as Sharmila Mishra: Arjun's mother
 Alok Nath Pathak as Ramashish Shukla
 Geetika Mehandru as Jhimli
 Daksh Sharma as Rajendra
 Mohit Tiwari as Gajju
 Yogendra Vikram Singh
 Sanjay Sonu

Production

Casting
Kinshuk Vaidya was cast to portray a Dalit boy, Badal. For his role, he lost 10 kgs to fit into the character.

Pranali Rathod was cast to portray Suman, marking her fiction debut with the show. She played a Banarasi character."

Sai Ballal was cast to portray Rathod's father. Avinash Mukherjee was cast to portray the negative lead in August 2022.

Filming
The series is set in Varanasi, Uttar Pradesh. It is mainly shot at the Film City, Mumbai and Varanasi. Some initial sequences were also shot at Lucknow.

Release
Jaat Na Poocho Prem Ki promos were released in May 2019. It premeried on 18 June 2019 on &TV.

Cancellation
Jaat Na Poocho Prem Ki went off air within 2 months on 26 August 2019, due to low viewership.

Adaptations
Jaat Na Poocho Prem Ki is the official television adaptation of the 2016 Marathi film Sairat and the 2018 Hindi film Dhadak.

Soundtrack

Jaat Na Poocho Prem Ki soundtrack is composed by Ajay–Atul. The title song is sung by Yasser Desai & Aishwarya Pandit.

See also
 List of programmes broadcast by & TV

References

External links
 
 Jaat Na Poocho Prem Ki on Zee5

2019 Indian television series debuts
2019 Indian television series endings